Jerry Sherlock is an American film and theater producer and educator known for such films as The Hunt for Red October. He was also the founder of the New York Film Academy School of Film and Acting. He resides in New York City.

Early life and background

Sherlock dropped out of school at the age of fourteen to join the carnival. From then on he was self-educated — he immersed himself in books published by the Modern Library, newspapers and magazines. After his time working with the circus he joined the United States Air Force, where he received an honorable discharge. Upon discharge, he started his career as a buyer for S. Klein On The Square (he would return to Union Square years later to house the New York Film Academy in the Tammany Hall Building), before eventually leaving to establish his own export business in Tokyo and Hong Kong.

He returned to New York to start Amtec, a surplus textiles firm, where he became a partner, until the time he opted to change his career path and enter the world of film.

He left textiles to establish his own film production company. Within six months of establishing his company he had produced his first film, Charlie Chan and the Curse of the Dragon Queen (1981), starring Michelle Pfeiffer (in one of her first major roles), Peter Ustinov and Angie Dickinson. Later in 1981, he would produce an Edward Albee adaptation of Vladimir Nabokov's novel Lolita on Broadway at the Brooks Atkinson Theatre. The play starred Donald Sutherland as Humbert Humbert.

As an independent producer for film, stage, and television, he developed projects for Disney, Warner Brothers, United Artists, Paramount, EMI and others. His credits include executive producer of the movie, The Hunt for Red October, for Paramount Pictures; producer of Lolita, a Broadway production; and executive producer of the television production, Amahl and the Night Visitors, for CBS.

New York Film Academy
Founded in 1992 by Sherlock, the New York Film Academy originally established itself at the Tribeca Film Center as a film school where students could "learn by doing." The school occupied the Tammany Hall building in Union Square for 23 years. It now has established campuses in Battery Park, Los Angeles, South Beach, and Sydney and Gold Coast Australia. NYFA also conducts workshops at Harvard University, Disney Studios Florida, Paris, Florence, China, Japan, Qatar, India, Indonesia, Japan, Russia, Korea, and more.

In addition to the international expansion, the school expanded in terms of its programs and curriculum. NYFA programs now include filmmaking, cinematography, acting, photography, producing, game design, graphic design, screenwriting, musical theatre, virtual reality, ESL, broadcast journalism, digital editing, music video, documentary filmmaking, and more.

Personal life 
Sherlock married a Japanese woman named Yumiko; their son Jean is now CEO of the New York Film Academy.

Producing Credits

Film
 Charlie Chan and the Curse of the Dragon Queen (1981)
 The Hunt for Red October (1990)

Television
Amahl and the Night Visitors (1978)

Theater
 Lolita (1981, Broadway) - written by Edward Albee, novel by Vladimir Nabokov, starring Donald Sutherland, 12 performances.

References

External links
 
 
MovieMaker Magazine

American film producers
New York Film Academy
1933 births
2015 deaths